Together at Christmas is a Christmas album by vocalist Etta Jones and saxophonist Houston Person which was recorded in 2000 and released on the Highnote label.

Track listing 
 "Frosty the Snowman" (Jack Rollins, Steve Nelson) – 5:07
 "Have Yourself a Merry Little Christmas" (Hugh Martin, Ralph Blane) – 5:54
 "Jingle Bells" (James Pierpont) – 5:02
 "I'll Be Home for Christmas" (Walter Kent, Kim Gannon, Buck Ram) – 3:27
 "Winter Wonderland" (Felix Bernard, Richard B. Smith) – 4:42
 "Silent Night" (Franz Xaver Gruber, Joseph Mohr) – 3:32
 "Let It Snow! Let It Snow! Let It Snow!" (Jule Styne, Sammy Cahn) – 3:53	
 "What Are You Doing New Year's Eve?" (Frank Loesser) – 6:17
 "Santa Claus Is Coming to Town" (J. Fred Coots, Haven Gillespie) – 3:07
 "White Christmas" (Irving Berlin) – 4:20
 "The Christmas Waltz" (Styne, Cahn) – 4:27
 "The Christmas Song" (Robert Wells, Mel Tormé) – 4:19

Personnel 
Etta Jones – vocals
Houston Person – tenor saxophone
Stan Hope – piano
George Kay – bass
Chip White – drums

References 

Etta Jones albums
Houston Person albums
HighNote Records albums
2000 Christmas albums
Christmas albums by American artists
Jazz Christmas albums